Junior G-Men of the Air is a 1942 Universal film serial starring the Dead End Kids and the Little Tough Guys. A group of youthful flying enthusiasts join the "Junior G-Men" to help break up a planned attack on the United States.

Plot
During World War II, members of The Dead End Kids, a youth gang, Billy "Ace" Holden, "Bolts" Larson, "Stick" Munsey, Ace's brother, Eddie, and "Greaseball" Plunkett are working in a salvage yard owned by Ace's father, recovering aircraft parts. While making their escape from robbing a bank, members of a fifth column organization, the "Order of the Black Dragonfly", steal the boys' wrecking truck.

When agent Don Ames from the State Bureau of Investigation, returns their truck, the gang who is distrustful of authority, especially, the "cops", refuse to give a description of the men who stole the truck. Don asks Jerry Markham, leader of the Little Tough Guys, called the "Junior G-Men" to ask Ace for help. Both boys are passionate about aircraft and flying and agree to join forces.

Meanwhile, Axis agents working for "The Baron", a Japanese leader of the "Order of the Black Dragonfly", have more plans for the junkyard, especially the aircraft parts stored there. The Baron has orders to destroy anything that may help the Allied cause. Ace and Jerry join together to go look for the enemy saboteurs and find their secret hideout in a farm outside the city.

The enemy agents capture Ace and Eddie, who escape in one of the aircraft that the Baron uses. Their takeoff ends in disaster as Ace hits a fence, tearing off the landing gear and punching a hole in the gasoline tank. The boys parachute to safety and make their way to government headquarters.

The Dead End Kids and Junior G-Men lead the government to the Baron's base and a furious battle takes place. Ace and Jerry personally capture the Baron and receive the government's thanks for bringing the enemy agents to justice.

Chapter titles

 Wings Aflame
 The Plunge of Peril
 Hidden Danger
 The Tunnel of Terror
 The Black Dragon Strikes
 Flaming Havoc
 The Death Mist
 Satan Fires the Fuse
 Satanic Sabotage
 Trapped in a Burning 'Chute
 Undeclared War
 Civilian Courage Conquers

Cast

The Dead End Kids and the Little Tough Guys

 Billy Halop as Billy "Ace" Holden
 Huntz Hall as "Bolts" Larson
 Gabriel Dell as "Stick" Munsey
 Bernard Punsly as "Greaseball" Plunkett
 David Gorcey as Double Face Gordon
 Billy Benedict as Whitey

Additional cast

 Gene Reynolds as Eddie Holden
 Lionel Atwill as The Baron, a Japanese spy
 Frank Albertson as Jerry Markham
 Richard Lane as Agent Don Ames
 Frankie Darro as Jack
 Turhan Bey as Araka, The Baron's "Spear-point Heavy" (chief henchman)
 John Bleifer as Beal, one of The Baron's henchmen
 Eddie Foster as Comora, one of The Baron's henchmen
 John Bagni as Augar, one of The Baron's henchmen
 Noel Cravat as Monk, one of The Baron's henchmen
 Eddy Waller (uncredited) as Jed Holden

Production
Junior G-Men of the Air was the third of Universal's three serials with the Dead End Kids and Little Tough Guys (preceded by Junior G-Men and Sea Raiders). The serial is the 55th of Universal's sound-era serials (following Gang Busters and ahead of Overland Mail) and is the last 12-chapter serial released by Universal.

The aircraft used in Junior G-Men of the Air are: 

 Fokker Super Universal c/n 826, NC972
 Travel Air 2000 c/n 181, NC901
 Ryan STA c/n 139, NC17305
 Brown B-3 NX266Y

The locale for Junior G-Men of the Air was the Metropolitan Airport, Van Nuys, California. Aircraft owners at the airport supplied the Hollywood studios with aircraft for both ground and aerial scenes.

Stunts

 David Sharpe doubling Billy Halop
 Tom Steele doubling Turhan Bey
 Ken Terrell

Reception
Hal Erickson on the Allmovie website reviewed Junior G-Men of the Air, condensing it to: "Over the course of twelve weeks, the kids are pitted against the worst kinds of villains and pluguglies, but by the final chapter our heroes have thwarted the Black Dragons' plans to sabotage the American defense program. Despite the serial's title, however, the "Junior G-Men" hardly spend any time at all in the air."

See also
 Junior G-Men
 Junior G-Men (serial)

References

Notes

Citations

Bibliography

 Cline, William C. "Filmography"., In the Nick of Time. Jefferson, North Carolina: McFarland & Company, Inc., 1984, .
 Farmer, James H. Celluloid Wings: The Impact of Movies on Aviation (1st ed.). Blue Ridge Summit, Pennsylvania: TAB Books 1984. .
 Rainey, Buck. Serials and Series: A World Filmography, 1912–1956. Jefferson, North Carolina: McFarland & Company, Inc., 2010. . 
 Weiss, Ken and Ed Goodgold. To be Continued ...: A Complete Guide to Motion Picture Serials. New York: Bonanza Books, 1973. .

External links
 
 
 

1942 films
American spy films
American aviation films
Pacific War films
American black-and-white films
1940s English-language films
Universal Pictures film serials
Films directed by Ray Taylor
Films directed by Lewis D. Collins
1940s action films
American action films
Films with screenplays by George H. Plympton
1940s American films